The Encyclopedia of Korea – a part of the Open Research Library Digital Collections – is the first comprehensive English language encyclopedia of Korea that covers multifarious fields of information on Korea.

Sixty Koreanists worldwide contributed some 1300 entries. Of these, Korean scholars contributed about 30 per cent and 70 per cent were from Koreanists including Martina Deuchler, David R. McCann, James Palais, Keith Howard, James Hoare and others from mainly English-speaking countries. Of the minor entries, many are English translations from the Encyclopaedia of Korean Culture and relevant Japanese and Chinese sources.

The contributors' names are recorded in the ‘List of Contributors and Translators’ and also at the end of the entry itself, complete with bibliographical references for further reading. The ‘Index of Entries’ is extensive (about 120 pages), and its contents include the entries in both Sino-Korean and English.

The Encyclopaedia is aimed at meeting a wide assembly of interest from academics, broadcasters, journalists, politicians, students, teachers and the general public, who want to know more about Korea in the English language.

The encyclopaedia has about 1500 pages. Korean words are Romanized according to the McCune–Reischauer Romanization System, with some minor exceptions. Overall Statistics (ANU Open Research Library Statistic for "Encyclopaedia of Korea") available since the Encyclopaedia became part of the ANU's Open Access Digital Collection in 2011, there have been 8,031 + views and 19,857 + downloads of whole and part articles.

The Encyclopaedia is hyperlinked. The Table of Contents, as well as over 1,000 entries and 700 cross-references in the Index of Entries, are hyperlinked to the relevant articles and references in the main text of the Encyclopaedia.

Notes

References
 Encyclopaedia of Korean Culture of Korea. 
Asian Library Resources of Australia /no.68 /07/2016

External links
 The Australian National University Open Research: Encyclopaedia of Korea – 
 Yang Hi Choe-Wall "...but as a Visiting Fellow of the University continued to work on the Encyclopaedia of Korea as Project Director and Chief Compiler until 1999." -.

Koreanists
Korean encyclopedias
English-language encyclopedias
Australian online encyclopedias
1999 non-fiction books
20th-century encyclopedias